Vasilj may refer to:

 , a masculine given name
 Vasilj (surname), a surname
 Vasilj (Knjaževac), a village in the municipality of Knjaževac, Serbia